A list of films produced in Egypt in 1938. For an A-Z list of films currently on Wikipedia, see :Category:Egyptian films.

References

External links
 Egyptian films of 1938 at the Internet Movie Database
 Egyptian films of 1938 elCinema.com

Lists of Egyptian films by year
1938 in Egypt
Lists of 1938 films by country or language